Alina Oganesyan (born 13 June 2004) is a German rhythmic gymnast. She won silver in the senior team category at the 2022 World Championships.

Career

Junior 

Oganesyan was part of the German junior group that competed at both the 2019 European and World Championships, finishing 12th in Baku and 10th in Moscow.

Senior 
Alina integrated the senior group in late 2021, competing at the World Championships, finishing 7th in the All-Around.

In 2022 she was selected to perform in the 5 hoops exercise at the 2022 Rhythmic Gymnastics European Championships in Tel Aviv, Israel, scoring 30.150, the group came in 12th place in the all-around. In the team ranking (individual and group), the German team placed 5th.  In late August she competed at the World Cup in Cluj-Napoca, winning bronze in the 3 ribbons + 2 balls' final. The following month she participated at the 2022 World Championships in Sofia, Bulgaria, the group made mistakes in the 5 hoops routine (that was scored 25.950) relegated them in 14th place in the All-Around, but they qualified for the 3 ribbons + 2 balls' final with the 6th score, the same place they ended up in the final. Following Bulgaria and Israel's withdrawal Germany was able to medal in the team competition, Alina and her teammates Anja Kosan, Daniella Kromm, Hannah Vester, Francine Schöning and the two individuals Margarita Kolosov and Darja Varfolomeev were awarded silver for their results.

References

Living people
2004 births
German rhythmic gymnasts
Medalists at the Rhythmic Gymnastics World Championships